Konstantin Vladimorovich Eggert (9 October 1883 – 24 October 1955) was a Russian actor and film director. He co-directed the 1925 film The Marriage of the Bear.

Selected filmography

Director
 The Marriage of the Bear (1925)
 The Lame Gentleman (1929)
 Gobseck (1937)

References

Bibliography
 Liz-Anne Bawden (ed.) The Oxford Companion to Film. Oxford University Press, 1976.

External links

1883 births
1955 deaths
Russian film directors
Russian male film actors
Russian male silent film actors
Russian male stage actors
Mass media people from Moscow